Dhivehi, also spelled Divehi, is the main language, used in the Maldive Islands. This may refer to:
Dhivehi people, an ethnic group native to the historic region of the Maldive Islands.
Dhivehi language, an Indo-Aryan language predominantly spoken by about 350,000 people  in the Republic of Maldives
Dhivehi script

Language and nationality disambiguation pages